"Early in the Mornin'" or "'Early in the Morning" is a song that was recorded by Louis Jordan and His Tympany Five in 1947.  It is an early example of a blues which incorporates Afro-Cuban rhythms and percussive instruments.  "Early in the Mornin'" became a hit, reaching number three in Billboard magazine's race records chart.

Jordan and his band later performed the song in the 1949 film Look Out Sister. It served as inspiration for James Brown and Chuck Berry.  Various artists have recorded renditions of "Early in the Mornin'", often spelled as "Early in the Morning" (not to be confused with the earlier Sonny Boy Williamson I song "Early in the Morning").

Original song
"Early in the Mornin'" has the structure of a twelve-bar blues with a strong rhythmic element.  It is credited to Jordan, Tympany Five bassist Dallas Bartley, and Leo Hickman and has been variously described as a rumba, a samba, a calypso-influenced song, and a "Caribbean-flavoured number".  As with many Jordan songs, it also has a comic element.  The song begins with Latin-style percussion and Jordan calls out "Hey Pedro! ... Where is Lolito?"  After a twelve-bar piano solo intro, Jordan's vocal begins:

Backing Jordan on vocal and alto sax are Wild Bill Davis on piano, Bartley on bass, and Christopher Columbus on drums.  Percussion is provided by band members Aaron Isenhall, Eddie Johnson, and Carl Hogan.

Look Out Sister

Louis Jordan recorded a second version of "Early in the Mornin'" in 1949 for Look Out Sister "a sixty-seven-minute picture that featured Louis as a musical cowboy".  His performance of the song was filmed in front of a U.S. southwestern-style ranch house with the band dressed in 1940s Hollywood cowboy garb.  In his autobiography, James Brown recalled seeing Jordan's films when he was young and was inspired by the showmanship of performances such as "Early in the Mornin'" and especially "Caldonia".

References

1947 songs
1947 singles
Louis Jordan songs
Blues songs
Songs written by Louis Jordan
Dinah Washington songs
B.B. King songs
Ray Charles songs
Ike & Tina Turner songs
Harry Nilsson songs
Decca Records singles